Wilna is a historical spelling of the name of the city of Vilnius.

Wilna may also refer to:

Wilna, New York, a town in Jefferson County, New York, United States
Wilna Hervey (1894 – 1979), an American silent film actress and artist
Wilna Adriaanse (born 1958), South African Afrikaans romantic fiction writer

See also
Wilno (disambiguation)
Vilna (disambiguation)